Fred D Hockin is a former Rhodesian international lawn bowler.

He won a bronze medal in the fours at the 1954 British Empire and Commonwealth Games in Vancouver with Alan Bradley, Alex Pascoe and Ronnie Turner.

References

Possibly living people
Zimbabwean male bowls players
Bowls players at the 1954 British Empire and Commonwealth Games
Commonwealth Games bronze medallists for Southern Rhodesia
Commonwealth Games medallists in lawn bowls
Medallists at the 1954 British Empire and Commonwealth Games